The European Alliance of Associations for Rheumatology (EULAR) formerly the European League Against Rheumatism is a European non-governmental organization which represents the people with arthritis/rheumatism, health professional and scientific societies of rheumatology of all the European nations.

The aims of EULAR are to reduce the burden of rheumatic diseases on the individual and society and to improve the treatment, prevention and rehabilitation of musculoskeletal diseases.

It promotes the translation of research advances into daily care and fights for the recognition of the needs of people with musculoskeletal diseases by the governing bodies in Europe.

Publication
The society is co-publisher together with BMJ of a medical journal, the Annals of the Rheumatic Diseases, and organises an annual scientific meeting, the Annual European Congress of Rheumatology.

The society also publishes recommendations for the diagnosis and therapy of various rheumatic musculoskeletal diseases (RMD). They are published in the Annals of the Rheumatic Diseases journal and accessible also through the organisation's website.

References

External links
 Official Website

Rheumatology organizations
Medical and health organisations based in Switzerland